Priyo Bandhabi is a 1975 Bengali film directed by Hiren Nag. This film written by Prabodh kumar Sanyal. The film has been music composed by Nachiketa Ghosh. This is a drama film. The film starring Tarun Kumar Chatterjee, Bhanu Bannerjee, Suchitra Sen, Dilip Mukherjee, Haradhan Bannerjee and Uttam Kumar in the lead roles.

Cast
 Tarun Kumar Chatterjee
 Bhanu Bannerjee
 Suchitra Sen
 Uttam Kumar
 Dilip Mukherjee
 Haradhan Bannerjee
 Gyanesh Mukherjee
 Nripati Chatterjee
 Nirmal Ghosh
 Suhil Majumdar
 Mani Srimani

References

External links
 

Bengali-language Indian films
1975 films
1970s Bengali-language films